Paul Will (born 1 March 1999) is a German professional footballer who plays as a midfielder for 3. Liga club Dynamo Dresden.

Club career
Will made his professional debut in the 3. Liga for Bayern Munich II on 20 July 2019, coming on as a substitute in the 88th minute for Angelo Mayer in the away match against Würzburger Kickers, which finished as a 3–1 loss. On 22 August 2020, he joined Dynamo Dresden on a three-year contract.

International career
Will made his debut for the Germany national under-20 team on 7 September 2018, coming on as a substitute in the 84th minute for Manuel Wintzheimer in the friendly match against the Czech Republic, which finished as a 3–2 home win for Germany.

Career statistics

Club

Notes

References

External links
 
 
 
 

1999 births
Living people
People from Marburg-Biedenkopf
Sportspeople from Giessen (region)
Footballers from Hesse
German footballers
Germany youth international footballers
Association football midfielders
FC Bayern Munich II players
3. Liga players
Regionalliga players